Charan (also Romanized as Chārān; also known as Jārān) is a village in Adaran Rural District, Asara District, Karaj County, Alborz Province, Iran. At the 2006 census, its population was 528, in 143 families.

Charan is situated among a cluster of villages located in Alborz mountain range north of Tehran in Iran. The primary access road is from the Chalous Road shortly before ascending towards the Kandivan Tunnel and Karaj Dam.

References 

Populated places in Karaj County